Harirampur may refer to:

 Harirampur Upazila, an upazila (subdistrict) of Bangladesh
 Harirampur (community development block), a subdistrict in Dakshin Dinajpur district, West Bengal, India
 Harirampur, West Bengal, a town in India
 Harirampur (Vidhan Sabha constituency), a constituency of the West Bengal Legislative Assembly